is a Japanese manga series by Kimiko Uehara. It won the 35th Shogakukan Manga Award for Children's manga.

References

1984 manga
Winners of the Shogakukan Manga Award for children's manga